Andreas Lipa (born 26 April 1971) is an Austrian football manager and former footballer who played as a defender and midfielder.

During a 19-year career, Lipa was active as a professional in Austria, Greece and England, playing for First Vienna, LASK, Austria Salzburg, Austria Lustenau, Grazer AK, Skoda Xanthi, Port Vale, Wiener Sport-Club and SV Wienerberg. He later managed First Vienna FC.

He also played at international level, earning one cap for the Austria national team in 2000.

Club career
Born in Vienna, Lipa spent his early career in his native Austria with First Vienna, LASK, Austria Salzburg, Austria Lustenau and Grazer AK.

Lipa left Austrian football, and after a trial with English club Portsmouth in January 2002, he joined up with Greek side Skoda Xanthi. Coach Nikos Karageorgiou led the Alpha Ethniki club to a 9th-place finish in 2002–03. In June 2003 he returned to England to sign with Port Vale of the Second Division. During a 5–1 defeat to Plymouth Argyle at Vale Park on 18 October 2003, Lipa made a racist comment to Plymouth player Jason Bent. Lipa wrote a letter of apology to Bent and said "he wished he could turn the clock back", but was docked a week's wages. Bent accepted the apology as Lipa claimed to have spoke "in the heat of the moment" and the club also issued a statement of apology, stating Lipa "is in no way racist". Despite this he was still charged by the Football Association. He scored twice in 33 games in 2003–04, finding himself sidelined from the first team after manager Brian Horton was replaced by Martin Foyle. He featured in two League One games for the "Valiants" in 2004–05, and after a spell plagued with injuries he was released in November 2004, returning to his native lands to re-sign with Austria Lustenau. He signed for Wiener Sport-Club in 2006 and the 37-year-old moved to SV Wienerberg in summer 2008. Despite being contracted to the club until 2010, he retired in June 2009.

International career
Lipa made one substitute appearance for the Austria national side in April 2000 in a 2–1 defeat to Croatia, replacing Günther Neukirchner on 67 minutes. He was handed his debut by Otto Barić, his former manager at Austria Salzburg.

Management career
Lipa coached the youth team at Austrian Regionalliga Regionalliga Ost side First Vienna FC, before being elevated to first team manager in April 2015. He led the club to a second-place finish behind SV Horn in the 2015–16 season, before he was replaced by SV Horn coach Hans Kleer.

Personal life
Lipa's English wife, Sarah Adams-Lipa, publicly spoke out against the WAGs culture in British football. She also appeared on the British TV programme Come Dine with Me, appearing on fourth week of programmes of the first series in 2005 and winning the £1,000 first prize. In 2009, it was revealed that the couple had been defrauded by Texan swindler Allen Stanford.

Career statistics

References

1971 births
Living people
Footballers from Vienna
Austrian footballers
Austria international footballers
Association football defenders
Association football midfielders
First Vienna FC players
LASK players
FC Red Bull Salzburg players
SC Austria Lustenau players
Grazer AK players
Austrian expatriate footballers
Expatriate footballers in Greece
Austrian expatriate sportspeople in Greece
Xanthi F.C. players
Expatriate footballers in England
Austrian expatriate sportspeople in England
Port Vale F.C. players
Wiener Sport-Club players
SV Wienerberger players
Austrian Football Bundesliga players
Super League Greece players
English Football League players
Austrian Regionalliga players
Austrian football managers
First Vienna FC managers
SC Austria Lustenau managers
Association football coaches